Long Tân is a commune (xã) and village in Đất Đỏ District, Bà Rịa–Vũng Tàu province, Vietnam, at . When it was part of South Vietnam, it was in Phước Tuy province.

It is renowned for its rubber plantations, and hosts a very small population of roughly 1,200 people.

The village, along with nearby Long Phước, Bà Rịa-Vũng Tàu, was cleared to make an exclusion zone around the Nui Dat Australian base near Bà Rịa. The destruction of the two villages formed part of the background for the Battle of Long Tan on 18 August 1966, where a small unit of Australian soldiers recorded a victory over a much larger force of North Vietnamese and Viet Cong soldiers.

History
The southern tip of Vietnam was colonised by Vietnam late after battles with Champa. Like many villages in the southern tip of Vietnam the village's official Confucian name contains the word 新 (tân) meaning "new". The element 隆 (long) probably means "prosperous". Hence "New Prosperity".

Battle

During this battle, 2,500 Việt Cộng and North Vietnamese attacked 108 Australian troops of 6th Battalion, Royal Australian Regiment. It is unclear how many Vietnamese were killed but records suggest 240–1,000 Vietnamese were killed, while Australian forces lost 18 in comparison.

The newly arrived 1st Australian Task Force established its Phước Tuy operations base in 1966 at Núi Đất, a piece of high ground surrounded by rubber plantations. The Viet Cong had achieved dominion in the province and decided to inflict a politically unacceptable defeat on the Australians. Their plan was to lure the Australians from their base by firing recoilless rifle and mortar shells into it. They theorised that the Australians would sweep the area around the base in an attempt to stop the attacks, and the Viet Cong would ambush the sweeping forces.

On the night of 16/17 August 1966, the Viet Cong fired a barrage of shells into Núi Đất, wounding 24 Australians. Prior to this event, the Australians had become aware, from radio intercepts and sightings, that a large enemy force was operating close to the base. Australian patrols sent out specifically to find the Viet Cong had not encountered the force.

On 18 August 1966 D Company of 6RAR was patrolling in the area of the Long Tân rubber plantation when, at about 3:15pm, the lead platoon (11 Platoon, commanded by 2Lt Gordon Sharp, a national serviceman) encountered a small group of Viet Cong who fled leaving one of their number killed by the Australians. The aggressive patrolling continued until, at about 4:08pm, the main body of the Viet Cong's 275th Regiment was encountered. The Viet Cong attacked vigorously with mortars, small arms and machine gun fire.

In pouring rain, the Australians returned fire with platoon weapons and artillery which was firing from the Núi Đất base, some five kilometres to the west. Close air support was also called for but couldn't be used because the target was unable to be identified accurately in the conditions.

At 5pm D Company's commander, Major Harry Smith, radioed for ammunition resupply. Two RAAF Iroquois helicopters which happened to be at Nui Dat to transport a concert party were tasked and flew at tree top level into the battle area where they successfully delivered the sorely needed boxes of ammunition.

The combination of aggressive fire from D Company soldiers plus devastating artillery fire from Núi Đất had swung the battle in the Australians' favour but the Viet Cong continued to manoeuvre to gain the upper hand. Meanwhile, A Company of 6RAR had been ordered to move to the support of the beleaguered D Company.

They did so mounted in armoured personnel carriers from 1st APC Squadron which forded a flooded stream and then shortly afterward encountered a substantial enemy force. 2 Platoon of A Company dismounted and advanced on the enemy who fled.

Although the Viet Cong could still be seen massing in failing light at 6:55pm as the relief force arrived in the D Company area, the enemy force melted away as darkness descended. The battle of Long Tân was over.

The Australians consolidated their position for the night and then commenced evacuation of their wounded using the lights from APCs to guide in helicopters. During the night the Viet Cong cleared many of their wounded and dead from the battle field. A number of the wounded Australians lay there all through the long terrifying night, as the Viet Cong moved around them.

Morning revealed that the NVA and VC force, estimated at 2,500, had been badly mauled. 245 VC/NVA bodies were found in the battle area, and 350 more had been wounded. It was apparent that the Viet Cong commanders had failed to appreciate the effectiveness of artillery fire and had paid dearly as a result.

The Australians had lost 18 killed, 17 from D Company (including the young platoon commander of 11 Platoon) and one from 1st APC Squadron, and 24 wounded.

References

External links
The Battle of Long Tan: News.com.au 40th Anniversary special
Vietnam – The Battle of Long Tan

Populated places in Bà Rịa-Vũng Tàu province
Communes of Bà Rịa-Vũng Tàu province